Earl Gardner may refer to:

 Earl Gardner (basketball) (1923–2005), American basketball player
 Earl Gardner (musician) (born 1950), American jazz trumpeter

See also
 Earle Gardner (1884–1943), American professional baseball player
 Erle Stanley Gardner (1889–1970), American lawyer and author of detective stories